Palazzo Zuccari may refer to:

 Palazzo Zuccari, Florence
 Palazzo Zuccari, Rome